The Criosfera 1 is a Brazilian standalone research module for atmospheric data collection, prepared at the National Institute for Space Research (INPE) for the Brazilian Antarctic Program (PROANTAR).

Location

Expedition Criosfera 1
The expedition for the placement of the module was coordinated by Universidade Federal do Rio Grande do Sul (UFRGS) through Professor Jefferson Cardia Simões, director of the Centro Polar e Climático (CPC). The Universidade Estadual do Rio de Janeiro (UERJ), was then represented by Professor Dr. Heitor Evangelista, responsible for the coordination of the project.

Among the scientific tasks developed by the staff are ice drilling, assembly and activation of the module, and the surveying of ice morphology and dynamics at the glacier.

Climate

Objective
The first Brazilian fully automatic data-collecting scientific module placed inside the Antarctic continent is intended for data collection concerning the analysis on reflexes of the pollutants generated in South America and in Antarctica. Data will be sent via satellite directly to the computers of the national institute (INPE).

See also
 List of Antarctic research stations
 List of Antarctic field camps

References

Outposts of Antarctica
Brazilian Antarctica
2012 establishments in Antarctica